Glória is a municipality in the state of Bahia in the North-East region of Brazil. It is located on the border of the states of Bahia,  Pernambuco, and Alagoas on the banks of the Moxito River, now a lake as the result of the construction of Moxito Hydroelectric Power Plant.

Languages
The Tuxá language was spoken along the São Francisco River near Glória.

See also
List of municipalities in Bahia

References

Municipalities in Bahia